Phylloneta is a genus of comb-footed spiders formerly considered a sub-genus of Allotheridion, and raised to genus status in 2008. The type species was first described by Eugen von Keyserling in 1884 as Theridion pictipes.  it contains three species and two subspecies with a holarctic distribution: P. impressa, P. pictipes, P. sisyphia, P. s. foliifera, and P. s. torandae.

See also
 List of Theridiidae species
Theridion

References

Further reading

Araneomorphae genera
Holarctic spiders
Theridiidae